Bradley Rodden (born 29 January 1989) is a New Zealand cricketer. He plays first-class cricket for Otago.

See also
 List of Otago representative cricketers

References

External links
 

1989 births
Living people
New Zealand cricketers
Otago cricketers
Cricketers from Christchurch